Peixe is a municipality in the state of Tocantins, Brazil.

Peixe may also refer to:

 Peixe (crater), a crater on Mars
 Emílio Peixe (born 1973), Portuguese footballer
 Renato Peixe (born 1979), Brazilian football manager and player
 Zé Peixe (1927–2012), Brazilian maritime pilot
 Peixes, a character in the webcomic Homestuck

See also
 Peixe River (disambiguation)
 César Guerra-Peixe (1914–1993), Brazilian musician